Koblenz is a German city on the banks of the Rhine and the Moselle, a multinational tributary.

Koblenz was established as a Roman military post by Drusus around 8 B.C. Its name originates from the Latin , meaning "(at the) confluence". The actual confluence is today known as the "German Corner", a symbol of the unification of Germany that features an equestrian statue of Emperor William I. The city celebrated its 2000th anniversary in 1992.

It ranks in population behind Mainz and Ludwigshafen am Rhein to be the third-largest city in Rhineland-Palatinate. Its usual-residents' population is 112,000 (as at 2015). Koblenz lies in a narrow flood plain between high hill ranges, some reaching mountainous height, and is served by an express rail and autobahn network.  It is part of the populous Rhineland.

Name
Historic spellings include Covelenz, Coblenz, and Cobelenz. 
In local dialect the name is as the first historic spelling indicates, in German orthography, Kowelenz.

History

Ancient era
Around 1000 BC, early fortifications were erected on the Festung Ehrenbreitstein hill on the opposite side of the Moselle. In 55 BC, Roman troops commanded by Julius Caesar reached the Rhine and built a bridge between Koblenz and Andernach. About 9 BC, the "Castellum apud Confluentes", was one of the military posts established by Drusus.

Remains of a large bridge built in 49 AD by the Romans are still visible. The Romans built two forts as protection for the bridge, one in 9 AD and another in the 2nd century, the latter being destroyed by the Franks in 259. North of Koblenz was a temple of Mercury and Rosmerta (a Gallo-Roman deity), which remained in use up to the 5th century.

Middle Ages
With the fall of the Western Roman Empire, the city was conquered by the Franks and became a royal seat. After the division of Charlemagne's empire, it was included in the lands of his son Louis the Pious (814). In 837, it was assigned to Charles the Bald, and a few years later it was here that Carolingian heirs discussed what was to become the Treaty of Verdun (843), by which the city became part of Lotharingia under Lothair I. In 860 and 922, Koblenz was the scene of ecclesiastical synods. At the first synod, held in the Liebfrauenkirche, the reconciliation of Louis the German with his half-brother Charles the Bald took place. The city was sacked and destroyed by the Norsemen in 882. In the second, slavery was condemned, specifically it was decreed that any man that 'led away a Christian man and then sold him' should be considered guilty of homicide. In 925, it became part of the eastern German Kingdom, later the Holy Roman Empire.

In 1018, the city was given by the emperor Henry II to the archbishop-elector of Trier after receiving a charter. It remained in the possession of his successors until the end of the 18th century, having been their main residence since the 17th century. Emperor Conrad II was elected here in 1138. In 1198, the battle between Philip of Swabia and Otto IV took place nearby. In 1216, prince-bishop Theoderich von Wied donated part of the lands of the basilica and the hospital to the Teutonic Knights, which later became the Deutsches Eck.

In 1249–1254, Koblenz was given new walls by Archbishop Arnold II of Isenburg; and it was partly to overawe the turbulent citizens that successive archbishops built and strengthened the fortress of Ehrenbreitstein that still dominates the city.

French Revolution

Home of Royalist Emigres

When the French Revolution broke out, Koblenz became a popular hub of royalist emigres and escaping feudal lords who had fled France.  It was sometime in mid-1791, after June but before October, that supporters of loyalty in Koblenz (as well as Worms and Brussels) were preparing an invasion of France that was to be supported by foreign armies, with conspirators regularly travel between Koblenz and Tuileries Palace, accepting encouragement and money from King Louis XVI, while secret committees were collecting arms and enrolling men and officers.  Among the notable emigres living at Koblenz can be counted Charles X, ex-minister Charles Alexandre de Calonne, and Louis XVIII.  Officers and men were recruited through the Gazette de Paris (sixty livres for each recruit), and the enrolled men were then sent to Metz and afterwards to Koblenz, and in a visit by Claude Allier to Koblenz in January, 1792, he stated that 60,000 men were armed and ready to take action.

Near Destruction by Royalist Forces

On July 26, 1792, the Duke of Brunswick, who commanded one of the invading armies, composed of 70,000 Prussians and 68,000 Austrians, Hessians and émigrés, began to march upon Koblenz.  He published a manifesto in which he threatened to set fire to the towns that dared to defend themselves, and to exterminate their inhabitants as rebels, including Koblenz.  The city's fate was at hand.  But, just as in World War 1, the torrential rains and difficult conditions of the Argonne forest halted the invaders, the roads "were liquid mud," and supplies began to run out due to weather impacting supply lines.  The radical revolutionary Georges Danton negotiated with the Duke of Brunswick, under unknown conditions, for his retreat, which was carried out through Grand-Pré and Verdun, then across the Rhine, and the city of Koblenz was saved.

Participation in the Vendee Uprising

In 1793, the uprising of Catholic peasants at the Vendée aimed at the overthrow of the National Assembly, which began only after emissaries from Koblenz traveled there, bringing papal bulls, royal decrees and gold.  In escaping the watchful eye of French revolutionary forces, these emissaries were aided and protected by the middle classes, the ex-slave-traders of Nantes, and the anti-sans-culottes, pro-England merchants.

Overall Influence

Due to their experience in the French Revolution, Peter Kropotkin had termed the phrase Koblenzian to describe the type of royalist emigres that lived in Koblenz.

Modern era
The city was a member of the league of the Rhenish cities which rose in the 13th century. The Teutonic Knights founded the Bailiwick of Koblenz in or around 1231. Koblenz attained great prosperity and it continued to advance until the disaster of the Thirty Years' War brought about a rapid decline. After Philip Christopher, elector of Trier, surrendered Ehrenbreitstein to the French, the city received an imperial garrison in 1632. However, this force was soon expelled by the Swedes, who in their turn handed the city over again to the French. Imperial forces finally succeeded in retaking it by storm in 1636.

In 1688, Koblenz was besieged by the French under Marshal de Boufflers, but they only succeeded in bombing the Old City (Altstadt) into ruins, destroying among other buildings the Old Merchants' Hall (Kaufhaus), which was restored in its present form in 1725. The city was the residence of the archbishop-electors of Trier from 1690 to 1801.

In 1786, the last archbishop-elector of Trier, Clemens Wenceslaus of Saxony, greatly assisted the extension and improvement of the city, turning the Ehrenbreitstein into a magnificent baroque palace. After the fall of the Bastille in 1789, the city became, through the invitation of the archbishop-elector's chief minister, Ferdinand Freiherr von Duminique, one of the principal rendezvous points for French émigrés. The archbishop-elector approved of this because he was the uncle of the persecuted king of France, Louis XVI. Among the many royalist French refugees who flooded into the city were Louis XVI's two younger brothers, the Comte de Provence and the Comte d'Artois. In addition, Louis XVI's cousin, Prince Louis Joseph de Bourbon, prince de Condé, arrived and formed an army of young aristocrats willing to fight the French Revolution and restore the Ancien Régime. The Army of Condé joined with an allied army of Prussian and Austrian soldiers led by Duke Karl Wilhelm Ferdinand of Brunswick in an unsuccessful invasion of France in 1792. This drew down the wrath of the First French Republic on the archbishop-elector; in 1794, Koblenz was taken by the French Revolutionary army under Marceau (who was killed during the siege), and, after the signing of the Treaty of Lunéville (1801) it was made the capital of the new French départment of Rhin-et-Moselle. In 1814, it was occupied by the Russians. The Congress of Vienna assigned the city to Prussia, and in 1822, it was made the seat of government for the Prussian Rhine Province.

After World War I, France occupied the area once again. The city was the center of the American occupation force from 1919 - 1923. In defiance of the French, the German populace of the city insisted on using the more German spelling of Koblenz after 1926. During World War II it hosted the command of German Army Group B and, like many counterparts, was heavily bombed and rebuilt afterwards. From 16 – 19 March 1945, it was the scene of heavy fighting by the U.S. 87th Infantry Division in support of Operation Lumberjack. Between 1947 and 1950, it served as the seat of government of Rhineland-Palatinate.

The Rhine Gorge was declared a World Heritage Site in 2002, with Koblenz marking the northern end.

Main sights

Fortified cities

Its defensive works are extensive, and consist of strong forts crowning the hills encircling the city to the west, and the citadel of Ehrenbreitstein on the opposite bank of the Rhine. The old city was triangular in shape, two sides being bounded by the Rhine and Mosel and the third by a line of fortifications. The latter were razed in 1890, and the city was permitted to expand in this direction. The Koblenz Hauptbahnhof (central station) was built on a spacious site outside the former walls at the junction of the Cologne-Mainz railway and the strategic Metz-Berlin line. In April 2011 Koblenz-Stadtmitte station was opened in the inner city to coincide with the opening of the Federal Garden Show 2011. The Rhine is crossed by the Pfaffendorf Bridge, originally the location of a rail bridge, but now a road bridge and, a mile south of city, by the Horchheim Railway Bridge, consisting of two wide and lofty spans carrying the Lahntal railway, part of the Berlin railway referred to above. The Moselle is spanned by a Gothic freestone bridge of 14 arches, erected in 1344, two modern road bridges and also by two railway bridges.

Since 1890, the city has consisted of the Altstadt (old city) and the Neustadt (new city) or Klemenstadt. Of these, the Altstadt is closely built and has only a few fine streets and squares, while the Neustadt possesses numerous broad streets and a handsome frontage along the Rhine.

Other sights
In the more ancient part of Koblenz stand several buildings which have a historical interest. Prominent among these, near the point of confluence of the rivers, is the Basilica of St. Castor or Kastorkirche, dedicated to Castor of Karden, with four towers. The church was founded in 836 by Louis the Pious, but the present Romanesque building was completed in 1208, the Gothic vaulted roof dating from 1498. In front of the church of Saint Castor stands a fountain, erected by the French in 1812, with an inscription to commemorate Napoleon's invasion of Russia. Not long after, Russian troops occupied Koblenz; and St. Priest, their commander, added in irony these words: "Vu et approuvé par nous, Commandant russe de la Ville de Coblence: Janvier 1er, 1814."

In this quarter of the city, too, is the Liebfrauenkirche, a fine church (nave 1250, choir 1404–1431) with lofty late Romanesque towers; the castle of the electors of Trier, erected in 1280, which now contains the municipal picture gallery; and the family house of the Metternichs, where Prince Metternich, the Austrian statesman, was born in 1773. Also notable is the church of St. Florian, with a two towers façade from c. 1110.

The former Jesuit College is a Baroque edifice by J.C. Sebastiani (1694–1698) serves as the current City Hall.

Near Koblenz is the Lahneck Castle near Lahnstein, open to visitors from 1 April to 31 October.

The city is close to the Bronze Age earthworks at Goloring, a possible Urnfield calendar constructed some 3000 years ago.

The mild climate allows fig trees, olive trees, palm trees and other mediterranean plants to grow in the area.

Electoral palace

In the modern part of the city lies the palace (Residenzschloss), with one front looking towards the Rhine, the other into the Neustadt. It was built in 1778–1786 by Clemens Wenceslaus, the last elector of Trier, following a design by the French architect P.M. d'Ixnard. In 1833, the palace was used as a barracks, and became a terminal post for the optical telecommunications system that originated in Potsdam. Today, the elector's former palace is a museum. Among other exhibits, it contains some Gobelin tapestries. From it some gardens and promenades (Kaiserin Augusta Anlagen) stretch along the bank of the Rhine, and in them is a memorial to the poet Max von Schenkendorf. A statue to the empress Augusta, whose favorite residence was Koblenz, stands in the Luisenplatz.

William I monument
The Teutonic Knights were given an area for their Deutschherrenhaus Bailiwick right at the confluence of the Rhine and Mosel, which became known as German Corner (Deutsches Eck).

In 1897, a monument to German Emperor William I of Germany, mounted on a -tall horse, was inaugurated there by his grandson Wilhelm II. The architect was Bruno Schmitz, who was responsible for a number of nationalistic German monuments and memorials.

During World War II, the statue was destroyed by US artillery. The French occupation administration intended the complete destruction of the monument and wanted to replace it with a new one.

In 1953, Bundespräsident Theodor Heuss rededicated the monument to German unity, adding the signs of the remaining western federal states as well as the ones of the lost areas in the East. A Flag of Germany has flown there since. The Saarland was added four years later after the population had voted to join Germany.

In the 1980s, a film clip of the monument was often shown on late night TV when the national anthem was played to mark the end of the day, a practice which was discontinued when nonstop broadcasting became common.
On October 3, 1990, the very day the former GDR states joined, their signs were added to the monument.

As German unity was considered complete and the areas under Polish administration were ceded to Poland, the monument lost its official active purpose, now only reminding of history. In 1993, the flag was replaced by a copy of the statue, donated by a local couple. The day chosen for the reinstatement of the statue, however, caused controversy as it coincided with Sedantag (Sedan Day) (September 2, 1870) a day of celebration remembering Germany's victory over France in the Battle of Sedan. The event was widely celebrated from the 1870s until the 1910s.

Incorporated villages 
Formerly separate villages now incorporated into the jurisdiction of the city of Koblenz

Economy

Koblenz is a principal seat of the Mosel and Rhenish wine trade, and also does a large business in the export of mineral waters. Its manufactures include automotive parts (braking systems – TRW Automotive, gas springs and hydraulic vibration dampers – Stabilus), aluminum coils (Aleris International, Inc.), pianos, paper, cardboard, machinery, boats, and barges. Since the 17th century, it has been home to the Königsbacher (now Koblenzer) brewery (the Old Brewery in Koblenz's historic center, and now a plant in Koblenz-Stolzenfels). It is an important regional transit hub.

The headquarters of the German Army Forces Command was located in the city until 2012. Its successor, the German Army Command (German: Kommando Heer, Kdo H) is based at the von-Hardenberg-Kaserne in Strausberg, Brandenburg.

The Bundeswehr's Joint Medical Service Headquarters was formed in 2012 as part of a larger reorganization of the Bundeswehr. It is based at the Falckenstein-Barracks (Falckenstein-Kaserne) and the Rhine-Barracks (Rhein-Kaserne) in Koblenz. It is the high command of the German Army Joint Medical Service. The Headquarters is also the Staff of the Inspector of the Joint Medical Service, Generaloberstabsarzt Dr. Ulrich Baumgaertner. 

An Amazon logistics hub located some  outside the city at the Autobahnkreuz Koblenz has been in operation since September 19, 2012.

Transport

Roads
To the west of the town is the autobahn A 61, connecting Ludwigshafen and Mönchengladbach, to the north is the east–west running A 48, connecting the A 1, Saarbrücken-Cologne, with the A 3, Frankfurt-Cologne. The city is also on various federal highways 9, 42, 49, 416, 258 and 327. The Glockenberg Tunnel connects the Pfaffendorf Bridge to the B 42.
The following bridges cross:

 the Rhine: Bendorf Autobahn Bridge, Pfaffendorf Bridge, Horchheim Rail Bridge, South Bridge
 the Moselle: Balduin Bridge, Mosel Rail Bridge, Europe Bridge, Koblenz Barrage, Kurt-Schumacher Bridge, Güls Rail Bridge

Railways
Koblenz Hbf is an Intercity-Express stop on the West Rhine Railway between Bonn and Mainz and is also served by trains on the East Rhine Railway Wiesbaden–Cologne. Koblenz is the beginning of the Moselle line to Trier (and connecting to Luxemburg and Saarbrücken) and the Lahntal railway to Limburg and Gießen. The other stations in Koblenz are Koblenz-Ehrenbreitstein, Koblenz-Güls, Koblenz-Lützel, Koblenz-Moselweiß and Koblenz Stadtmitte, which opened on 14 April 2011.

Education
The campus Koblenz of University of Koblenz and Landau is located in the city. The Koblenz University of Applied Sciences (German: Hochschule Koblenz) is also located in the city.

Twin towns – sister cities

Koblenz is twinned with:

 Nevers, France (1963)
 Haringey, United Kingdom (1969)
 Norwich, United Kingdom (1978)

 Novara, Italy (1991)
 Austin, United States (1992)
 Petah Tikva, Israel (2000)
 Varaždin, Croatia (2007)

Popular culture

The children's toy yo-yo was nicknamed de Coblenz (Koblenz) in 18th-century France, referring to the large number of noble French émigrées then living in the city.

The arrow of virtue (Tugendpfeil) is a large gold or silver hairpin from the female headdress of Koblenz and the left bank of the Rhine until the beginning of the 20th century. It was traditionally worn by young Catholic girls between puberty and marriage.

Notable people

Thomas Anders (born 1963), singer, the lead singer of duo Modern Talking
Cathinka Buchwieser (1789–1828), operatic soprano and actress
Milo Emil Halbheer (1910–1978), artist
Valéry Giscard d'Estaing (1926–2020), president of France from 1974 to 1981
Otto Griebling (1896–1972), circus clown who performed with the Ringling Brothers
Betty Hall (1921–2018), American politician
Karl Haniel (1877–1944), civil servant and entrepreneur
Ottilie von Hansemann (1840–1919), women rights activist
Bodo Illgner (born 1967), soccer player
Philip Krautkremer (1844-1922), American farmer and politician
Max von Laue (1879–1960), physicist, won Nobel Prize in Physics in 1914
Tobias Lütke (born 1981), billionaire entrepreneur, founder and CEO of Shopify
Klemens von Metternich (1773–1859), Austrian diplomat, chancellor, and foreign minister, architect of the Congress of Vienna
Johannes Peter Müller (1801–1858), physiologist, comparative anatomist, ichthyologist, and herpetologist

References

Notes

Bibliography

External links

  
 Koblenz City Panoramas – Panoramic views and virtual tours
 Official Town map of Koblenz (needs Java and JavaScript)
Richard Stillwell, ed. Princeton Encyclopedia of Classical Sites, 1976: "Ad Confluentes (Koblenz), Germany
 Online Magazin Koblenz
 Entrümpelung Koblenz
 Werbeagentur Koblenz

 
0s BC establishments
Cities in Rhineland-Palatinate
Districts of the Rhine Province
Populated places on the Rhine